The Hyundai i30 N TCR is a racing car developed by Hyundai Motorsport, which was built according to the TCR rule system. It is based on the Hyundai i30 5-door hatchback.

The project started in September 2016 with the help of Gabriele Tarquini and Alain Menu and the car completed its first test laps in April 2017. The cars made their debut in the final rounds of the 2017 season of the TCR International Series, but they also set out for testing at this year's 24-hour race in Misano and at the TCR European Cup event on the Adria International Raceway. In addition to the basic model, the car is also available in an Endurance version. In this case, ABS, additional headlights and accessories for external refueling are also included with the car.

The number one target of the i30 N TCR is to race the model on the European continent, while the successor Veloster N TCR is promoted by Hyundai Motorsport in the U.S. and South Korean markets as well as in the Pure ETCR series.

Championship titles

References

TCR cars
Cars introduced in 2017
Front-wheel-drive vehicles
i30 N TCR